Kondan may refer to the name of several villages in Burma in Homalin Township, Sagaing Region:

Kondan (24°43"N 95°10"E) 
Kondan (24°46"N 95°8"E)
Kondan (24°48"N 95°2"E)